Birama Ndoye (born 27 March 1994) is a Senegalese professional footballer who plays as a centre back or defensive midfield  for Saudi First Division League side Al-Arabi.

Club career
He grew up in Dakar with the dream of being a professional footballer. His father wanted him to make studies, but joined the junior club of "L'étoile sportive de Dakar", and his good performances made him climb to the professional team.

To continue his progression, Ndoye left his continent and family, and went in Europe. He made a few tests in Italian (Parma & Empoli) but they could not find a deal. FC Sion give him his chance and he joined the M21 team. The number 34 made about 20 games in Promotion League and scored two goals. He made his Swiss Super League debut at 25 May 2013 against FC Thun. He played the full game.

On 7 July 2022, Ndoye joined Saudi Arabian club Al-Arabi.

References

1994 births
Living people
Association football midfielders
Senegalese footballers
Senegalese expatriate footballers
Swiss Super League players
Saudi First Division League players
FC Sion players
Al-Arabi SC (Saudi Arabia) players
Expatriate footballers in Switzerland
Expatriate footballers in Saudi Arabia
Senegalese expatriate sportspeople in Saudi Arabia